The Ghana national cricket team represents Ghana in men's international cricket. It is an associate member of the International Cricket Council, which it joined as an affiliate member in 2002, and mainly plays matches in Africa Cricket Association tournaments. Ghana Cricket Association promotes the sport in the country.

A team representing the British Gold Coast played its first recorded match in 1904, and international matches from 1907. Known as Ghana after independence in 1957, until recent times the majority of the team's matches came against other West African teams, and occasionally against touring English teams. In 1976, Ghana joined the West Africa Cricket Council, with Ghanaian players representing the West African cricket team in international tournaments.

Following the breakup of the council, the Ghana Cricket Association gained affiliate membership of the International Cricket Council (ICC) in 2002, with the national side making its debut at an ICC tournament in 2004. The first ICC tournament for the team was in Division Three of 2006 World Cricket League Africa Region, where it finished at third position. The team won the Division Three of 2008 World Cricket League Africa Region by defeating Swaziland in the final.

History

Colonial era
CricketArchive records a team representing the Gold Coast, a British colony, as having played its first match in May 1904, against Lagos Colony (in present-day Nigeria). Similar fixtures were played in the following two seasons, with the venue alternating between Lagos and Accra. A team representing the Southern Nigeria Protectorate toured in April 1907. Similar matches were played again in 1911, 1912, and 1913, with the host alternating each year. Although the sport had been introduced by British settlers, representative teams were multiracial from an early stage – the 1912 Gold Coast–Southern Nigeria fixture, the only pre-war match for which a scorecard is available, featured names like Otoo, Sagoe, Agbokpo, and Akufo (for Gold Coast), and Layode and Oseni (for Southern Nigeria). Gold Coast's Otoo took six wickets in Southern Nigeria's second innings, helping Gold Coast to an innings victory. However, European-only matches were introduced around the same time, beginning in 1906 and ending only in 1956, the year before Ghanaian independence. The Gold Coast's leading runscorer in the inaugural European-only fixture was Gordon Guggisberg, who had earlier played a single first-class match (and was later Governor of the Gold Coast, from 1919 to 1927).

After a long gap, inter-colonial matches resumed in April 1926, when the Gold Coast played the Nigerian national team in Lagos. Gold Coast–Nigeria fixtures, both multiracial and European-only, were played almost annually from 1926 to 1939, and resumed again after World War II. In several years the European-only fixtures were played in provincial cities like Kumasi and Ibadan, although multiracial games were played only in the capitals. Gold Coast sides were occasionally bolstered by players of first-class standard – for instance, Cecil Pullan (Oxford University and Worcestershire) and Michael Green (Gloucestershire and Essex) appeared together in a 1937 match, with Pullan appearing again after the war. The national side played its first match as "Ghana" less than a month after Kwame Nkrumah's independence declaration in March 1957, with annual Ghana–Nigeria matches occurring until 1964.

West African era
A Marylebone Cricket Club (MCC) side toured West Africa during the 1975–76 season, and played two matches at Accra's Achimota School in January 1976 – one against an Accra side and one against the Ghanaian national side. The West Africa Cricket Council was formed later in 1976, with The Gambia and Sierra Leone joining Ghana and Nigeria as members. Consequently, with the exception of the quadrangular West African Championships, first held in 1976, Ghanaian cricketers played international matches only for the combined West African team, which made its international debut at the 1982 ICC Trophy. The West African side at the 1997 ICC Trophy was captained by Edinam Nutsugah, a Ghanaian. At that tournament, another Ghanaian, Daniel Vanderpuje-Orgle, took 5/31 against Israel, one of only four five-wicket hauls at the tournament. However, the West Africa Cricket Council lost significance in 2000, when Nigeria applied for separate membership of the ICC. The council was disbanded in 2003, with its members having become ICC members the previous year – Gambia, Ghana, and Sierra Leone were made affiliate members, and Nigeria an associate member.

2000-2018
A 2000 CricInfo article noted that cricket in Ghana was then confined to the south of the country, played only in the capital and the cities of Kumasi and Obuasi. It was also said to be particularly popular amongst the expatriate British and Indian populations, with the main club league featuring two Indian teams out of four total. Ghana played its first ICC tournament in March 2004, defeating Malawi in a play-off to finish third (of eight teams) in the Africa Affiliates Tournament. That tournament was part of the qualification process for the 2007 World Cup. The inaugural edition of the World Cricket League commenced in 2007, preceded by various regional qualifying tournaments. At the 2006 Africa Division Three qualifier, Ghana placed third behind Mozambique and Sierra Leone, again defeating Malawi in a third-place playoff. The playoff was noted for the performance of Ghanaian player Peter Ananya (a future national captain), who took 7/25 to bowl Malawi out for 41.

Ghana won the 2008 Africa Division Three tournament by defeating Swaziland in the final, having earlier bowled Rwanda out for 23 in their semi-final. They were subsequently promoted to the 2008 Africa Division Two tournament, but could only place fifth from six teams. This was enough, however, for Ghana to maintain its place for the 2010 Division Two event. At that tournament, they placed second to Zambia, securing entry to the 2012 Global Division Eight tournament. The only African side at the eight-team tournament, played in Samoa, Ghana lost only two matches, both to Vanuatu, placing runner-up and qualifying for the 2013 Global Division Seven event. Three of the six sides there were African, the others being Nigeria and Botswana, the hosts. Ghana won only two matches, both against Germany, and were relegated back to the regional tournaments system.

In international Twenty20 cricket, Ghana played its first tournaments in 2011, finishing runner-up to Nigeria in the 2011 Africa Division Two Twenty20 tournament and then fifth in 2011 Division One, both part of qualification for the 2012 World Twenty20. Earlier in the year, Ghana had hosted the Africa Division Three Twenty20, its first time hosting a senior ICC tournament. Ghana placed fourth at the 2012 Africa Division Two Twenty20, failing to qualify for the following year's Division One event. However, they went on to win the 2014 Division Two Twenty20, defeating Zambia on net run rate, and consequently progressing to the 2015 Africa Twenty20 Championship. There, Ghana defeated Tanzania, Botswana, and Uganda (for the first time), finishing fourth behind Uganda on net run rate. Against Uganda, Ghana had made only 74/9 from its 20 overs, but managed to bowl Uganda (a previous winner of the tournament) out for 69.

In August 2018, they were included in the 2018 Africa T20 Cup tournament. However, Ghana declined Cricket South Africa's invite to compete in the tournament, and were replaced by Uganda.

2018-Present
In April 2018, the ICC decided to grant full Twenty20 International (T20I) status to all its members. Therefore, all Twenty20 matches played between Ghana and other ICC members after 1 January 2019 will be a full T20I. Ghana's first T20I match was against Namibia on 20 May 2019, after finishing top of the North-Western sub-region qualification group, advancing to the Regional Final of the 2018–19 ICC World Twenty20 Africa Qualifier tournament.

In 2021 Ghana was among five teams excluded from the ICC T20I Championship for failing to play enough fixtures in the relevant period, an effect of the COVID-19 pandemic.

Tournament history

World Cricket League
2006 Africa Division Three: 3rd (8 teams)
2008 Africa Division Three: 1st (8 teams) – promoted
2008 Africa Division Two: 5th (6 teams)
2010 Africa Division Two: 2nd (6 teams)
2012 Global Division Eight: 2nd (8 teams) – promoted
2013 Global Division Seven: 5th (6 teams) – relegated
2017 ICC World Cricket League Africa Region Qualifiers: 1st (6 teams)
2017 Global Division Five: 7th (8 teams) –  relegated

ICC Africa Twenty20 Championship
2011 Division Two: 2nd (9 teams) – promoted
2011 Division One: 5th (5 teams) – relegated
2012 Division Two: 4th (8 teams)
2013 Division One: did not qualify
2014 Division Two: 1st (6 teams) – promoted
2015 Division One: 4th (6 teams)

Records and Statistics 

International Match Summary — Ghana
 
Last updated 9 December 2022

Twenty20 International 

 Highest team total: 239/5 v. Lesotho, 17 October 2021 at Gahanga International Cricket Stadium, Kigali. 
 Highest individual score: 107*, Obed Harvey v. Gambia, 8 December 2022 at Gahanga International Cricket Stadium, Kigali. 
 Best individual bowling figures: 5/9, Kofi Bagabena v. Seychelles, 16 October 2021 at Gahanga International Cricket Stadium, Kigali. 

Most T20I runs for Ghana

Most T20I wickets for Ghana

T20I record versus other nations

Records complete to T20I #1951. Last updated 8 December 2022.

Other matches
For a list of selected international matches played by Ghana, see Cricket Archive.

See also
 List of Ghana Twenty20 International cricketers

References

Cricket in Ghana
National cricket teams
Cricket
Ghana in international cricket